The Namesake  (2003) is the debut novel by American author Jhumpa Lahiri. It was originally published in The New Yorker and was later expanded to a full-length novel. It explores many of the same emotional and cultural themes as Lahiri's Pulitzer Prize-winning short story collection Interpreter of Maladies. The novel moves between events in Calcutta, Boston, and New York City, and examines the nuances involved with being caught between two conflicting cultures with distinct religious, social, and ideological differences.

Plot

The story begins as Ashoke and Ashima Ganguli, a young Bengali couple, leave Calcutta, India, and settle in Central Square in Cambridge, Massachusetts. Ashoke is an engineering student at the Massachusetts Institute of Technology (MIT). Ashima struggles through language and cultural barriers as well as her own fears as she delivers her first child alone. Had the delivery taken place in Calcutta, she would have had the baby at home, surrounded by family. The delivery is successful, but the new parents learn they cannot leave the hospital before giving their son a legal name.

The traditional naming process in their families is to have an elder who will give the new baby a name, and the parents wait for the letter from Ashima's grandmother. The letter never arrives, and soon after, the grandmother dies. Bengali culture calls for a child to have two names, a pet name to be called by family, and a good name to be used in public. Ashoke suggests the name of Gogol, in honor of the famous Russian author Nikolai Gogol, to be the baby's pet name, and they use this name on the birth certificate. As a young man, Ashoke survived a train derailment with many fatalities. He had been reading a short story collection by Gogol just before the accident, and lying in the rubble of the accident he clutched a single page of the story "The Overcoat" in his hand. With many broken bones and no strength to move or call out, dropping the crumpled page is the only thing Ashoke can do to get the attention of medics looking for survivors. This motivated him to move far away from home and start anew. Though the pet name has deep significance for the baby's parents, it is never intended to be used by anyone other than family. They decide on Nikhil to be his good name.

Gogol grows up perplexed by his pet name. Entering kindergarten, the Gangulis inform their son that he will be known as Nikhil at school. The five-year-old objects, and school administrators send him home with a note pinned to his shirt stating that he would be called Gogol at school, as was his preference. As Gogol progresses through school, he resents his name more and more for its oddness and the strange genius for whom he was named. Ashoke senses that Gogol is not old enough to understand its significance. When he informs his parents that he wishes to change his name, his father reluctantly agrees. Shortly before leaving for college, Gogol legally changes his name to Nikhil Ganguli.

This change in name and Gogol's going to Yale, rather than following his father's footsteps to MIT, sets up the barriers between Gogol and his family. The distance, both geographically and emotionally, between Gogol and his parents continues to increase. He wants to be American, not Bengali. He goes home less frequently, dates American girls, and becomes angry when anyone calls him Gogol. During his college years, he smokes cigarettes and marijuana, goes to many parties, and loses his virginity to a girl he cannot remember.

As he is going home for the summer, Gogol's train is suddenly stopped when a man jumped in front of the train. Ashoke, waiting at the train station for Gogol, becomes concerned and upon arriving home, finally explains the true significance of Gogol's name. Gogol is deeply troubled by this.

After graduating from Columbia University, Gogol obtains a very small apartment in New York City, where he lands a job in an established architectural office. He is stiff, perpetually angry or else always on the lookout for someone to make a stereotypical comment about his background.

At a party, Gogol meets an outgoing girl named Maxine, with whom he begins a relationship. Maxine's parents are financially well off and live in a four-story house in New York City, with one floor occupied entirely by Maxine. Gogol moves in with them, and becomes an accepted member of her family. When Maxine's parents visit her grandparents in the mountains of New Hampshire for the summer, they invite Maxine and Gogol to join them.

Gogol introduces Maxine to his parents. Ashima dismisses Maxine as something that Gogol will eventually get over. Shortly after, Ashoke dies of a heart attack while teaching in Ohio. Gogol travels to Ohio to gather his father's belongings and his father's ashes. Gogol gradually withdraws from Maxine, eventually breaking up with her. He begins to spend more time with his mother and sister, Sonia.

Later, Ashima suggests that Gogol contact Moushumi, the daughter of one of her friends, whom Gogol knew when they were children, and who broke up with her fiancé Graham shortly before their wedding. Gogol is reluctant to meet with Moushumi because she is Bengali, but does so anyway to please his mother.

Moushumi and Gogol are attracted to one another and eventually are married. However, by the end of their first year of marriage, Moushumi becomes restless. She feels tied down by marriage and begins to regret it. Gogol also feels like a poor substitute for Graham. He feels betrayed when she casually reveals his old name at a party with her friends. Eventually, Moushumi has an affair with Dimitri, an old acquaintance, the revelation of which leads to the end of their marriage. With Sonia preparing to marry her fiancé, a Chinese-American named Ben, Gogol is once again alone. As Ashima prepares to return to India, Gogol picks up a collection of the Russian author's stories that his father had given him as a birthday present many years ago.

Film adaptation
A film adaptation of the novel was released in the United States, Canada, United Kingdom, and India in March 2006. It was directed by Mira Nair and featured a screenplay written by Sooni Taraporevala.

Bengali version
The Namesake was published in Bengali by Ananda Publishers on 2005 under the title Samanamiie (বাংলা:সমনামী) translated by Paulami Sengupta.

See also

 Nikolai Gogol

References

External links
Powell's review

2003 American novels
Indian novels adapted into films
Novels by Jhumpa Lahiri
Works originally published in The New Yorker
Novels set in Kolkata
Novels set in Boston
Novels set in New York City
Houghton Mifflin books
Indian diaspora in fiction
American novels adapted into films
2003 Indian novels
Indian-American culture
2003 debut novels